Catherine Morin-Desailly (born 6 July 1960 in Le Petit-Quevilly, Seine-Maritime) is a French politician of the Union of Democrats and Independents (UDI) who has been serving as a member of the Senate of France since 2004, representing the Seine-Maritime department.

Political career
In the Senate, Morin-Desailly serves on the Committee on Cultural Affairs and the Committee on European Affairs. Since 2014, she has been chairing the Committee on Cultural Affairs. In 2020, she also chaired the Senate’s fact-finding committee on the issue of repatriation of cultural heritage.

In addition to her committee assignments, Morin-Desailly chairs the French-Egyptian Parliamentary Friendship Group.

In late 2008, Morin-Desailly left the Democratic Movement (MoDem), to join the Centrists (LC). From 2009, she served as the party’s spokesperson on cultural affairs and media.

Other activities
 FRAC Normandie Rouen, Chair of the Board

Political positions
In June 2014, together with Chantal Jouanno, Morin-Desailly tabled a motion for a resolution to grant asylum to Edward Snowden.

References

Page on the Senate website

1960 births
Living people
People from Le Petit-Quevilly
Politicians from Normandy
Union for French Democracy politicians
Democratic Movement (France) politicians
The Centrists politicians
French Senators of the Fifth Republic
Women members of the Senate (France)
University of Rouen Normandy alumni
21st-century French women politicians
Union of Democrats and Independents politicians
Senators of Seine-Maritime